Lawrence Michael Brown FRS HonFRMS (born 18 March 1936) is a British material scientist.
He is emeritus fellow at Robinson College, Cambridge.

In 2017 he was made an Honorary Fellow of the Royal Microscopical Society (HonFRMS) for his contributions to microscopy.

Life
He was W M Tapp fellow at Gonville and Caius College, Cambridge.

References

1936 births
Fellows of the Royal Society
Alumni of Gonville and Caius College, Cambridge
Fellows of Robinson College, Cambridge
Living people
British materials scientists
Honorary fellows of the Royal Microscopical Society